The 2004 season of the Belgian Football League (BFL) is the regular season played in the Belgium. The Antwerp Diamonds won Belgian Bowl XVII against the Leuven Lions by a score of 12-0.

Regular season

Regular season standings
W = Wins, L = Losses, T = Ties, PCT = Winning Percentage, PF= Points For, PA = Points Against The top four teams of the regular season are seeded into playoffs for the Belgian Bowl.

 - clinched seed to the playoffs

Post season

References

American football in Belgium
BFL
BFL